Callengeville is a commune in the Seine-Maritime department in the Normandy region in northern France. It was formed in 1973 by the merger of the former communes Bosc-Geffroy and Les Essarts-Varimpré.

Geography

Population

Places of interest
 The church of St.Laurent, dating from the sixteenth century.
 The church of St.Mathurin, dating from the eighteenth century.

See also
Communes of the Seine-Maritime department

References

Communes of Seine-Maritime